Barnack railway station was a station in the Soke of Peterborough (now Cambridgeshire) serving the village of Barnack. Despite being located adjacent to the village, the more remote Uffington & Barnack station on the Midland Railway Leicester to Peterborough line was more convenient for many journeys. The S&ER was leased to the Great Northern Railway at the end of 1892. The line never really recovered from the 1926 general strike, and the station closed with the line on 1 July 1929. In 2014 the building survives as a private house.

References

Disused railway stations in Cambridgeshire
Former Great Northern Railway stations
Transport in Peterborough
Buildings and structures in Peterborough
Railway stations in Great Britain opened in 1867
Railway stations in Great Britain closed in 1929
railway station